Aleysky District is an administrative and municipal district (raion), one of the fifty-nine in Altai Krai, Russia. It is located in the center of the krai. Its administrative center is the town of Aleysk (which is not administratively a part of the district). Population:

Administrative and municipal status
Within the framework of administrative divisions, Aleysky District is one of the fifty-nine in the krai. The town of Aleysk serves as its administrative center, despite being incorporated separately as a town of krai significance—an administrative unit with the status equal to that of the districts.

As a municipal division, the district is incorporated as Aleysky Municipal District. The town of krai significance of Aleysk is incorporated separately from the district as Aleysk Urban Okrug.

References

Notes

Sources



Districts of Altai Krai